Stephy Alvaro Mavididi (born 31 May 1998) is an English professional footballer who plays as a striker for Ligue 1 club Montpellier.

Club career

Arsenal 
Born in Derby, Mavididi began his career at Southend United before joining Arsenal at the age of 13. He turned professional with Arsenal in July 2015.

Mavididi joined Charlton Athletic on loan on 31 January 2017 until the end of the season. However, following an injury in his fifth game for the club, he returned to Arsenal on 1 March 2017, having made three starts and two substitute appearances.

He signed on loan for Preston North End in August 2017.

On 3 January 2018, it was announced by Arsenal that Mavididi had returned to the club and was then subsequently sent on loan with Charlton Athletic. In his first game of his second loan spell at Charlton he scored his first goal in professional football in a 1–0 win over Oldham Athletic. In February 2018 he suffered a hamstring injury.

Juventus 
After eight years with Arsenal, in August 2018, he signed for Italian club Juventus. He was initially signed as a reserve player, having been scouted by  Giorgio Chiellini's brother, but soon began training with the first team. On 13 April 2019, Mavididi made his senior Juventus debut in a 2–1 away loss against S.P.A.L. in Serie A. In doing so he became the first English player since David Platt in 1992 to play for Juventus. Juventus won the Serie A title in his first season, but Mavididi did not receive a winner's medal as he had not played in enough matches. Shortly after the championship title was confirmed, Mavididi learned that his father had died.

On 29 August 2019, he joined French club Dijon on loan.

Montpellier 
On 30 June 2020, Mavididi joined French club Montpellier in a permanent deal worth €6.3 million.

International career
Mavididi was born in England and is of Congolese descent. Mavididi has played for England at under-17 youth level, representing them at the 2015 UEFA European Under-17 Championship, and the 2015 FIFA U-17 World Cup. He has also played for England at under-18 and under-19 levels.

Although he is eligible to play for the Congo national football team, Mavididi appeared to commit himself to England in December 2020, stating “my ultimate goal is to get into England’s senior team, but for now the best pathway is the Under-21s so I want to try and get into that squad”.

Career statistics

References

1998 births
Living people
Footballers from Derby
Association football forwards
English footballers
England youth international footballers
English sportspeople of Democratic Republic of the Congo descent
Southend United F.C. players
Arsenal F.C. players
Charlton Athletic F.C. players
Preston North End F.C. players
Juventus Next Gen players
Juventus F.C. players
Dijon FCO players
Montpellier HSC players
English Football League players
Serie A players
Serie C players
Ligue 1 players
English expatriate footballers
English expatriate sportspeople in Italy
Expatriate footballers in Italy
English expatriate sportspeople in France
Expatriate footballers in France